Elena Sánchez Sánchez (born 29 May 1979), usually credited as Elena S. Sánchez, is a Spanish journalist and television presenter, associated to both the public broadcaster RTVE and entertainment journalism.

Biography 
Born on 29 May 1979, she was raised in Gavilanes, in the province of Ávila. She earned a degree in journalism from the Complutense University of Madrid.

In 2022, she was appointed as director of Historia de nuestro cine, of which she was also the host since 2015.

References 
Informational notes

Citations

Entertainment journalists
1979 births
RTVE
Spanish journalists
Spanish women television presenters
Living people